Antônio Cláudio de Jesus Oliveira (born 16 April 1973), known as just Antonio Claudio, is a Brazilian professional football
manager and former player who is currently the assistant coach of the Bali United.

Honours

Club
Persija Jakarta
 Liga Indonesia Premier Division: 2001

References

1973 births
Association football defenders
Brazilian expatriate footballers
Brazilian expatriate sportspeople in Indonesia
Brazilian footballers
Expatriate footballers in Indonesia
Indonesian Premier Division players
Antonio Claudio de Jesus Oliveira
Living people
Persija Jakarta players
Persih Tembilahan players
Semen Padang F.C. players
Persib Bandung players
Antonio Claudio de Jesus Oliveira
Expatriate footballers in Thailand